Tridrepana obscura is a moth in the family Drepanidae. It was described by Allan Watson in 1957. It is found in Indonesia (Java, Bali, Sumatra).

The wingspan is about 26.2-33.7 mm for males and 34-36.4 mm for females. There are two forms, a yellow form and a pale brown form. Adults are similar to Tridrepana albonotata, but can be distinguished by the smaller cell spots, differently marked medial shade and less distinctly marked subterminal line on the upperside of the forewings in both sexes.

References

Moths described in 1957
Drepaninae
Moths of Indonesia